Sidney is a city in and the county seat of Richland County, Montana, United States, less than  west of the North Dakota border.  The population was 6,346 at the 2020 census. The city lies along the Yellowstone River and is in proximity to the badlands of the Dakotas.  Sidney is approximately midway between Glendive, Montana and Williston, North Dakota.

History
Settlers began arriving in the area in the 1870s, and a post office was established in 1888. Six-year-old Sidney Walters and his parents were staying with Hiram Otis, the local justice of the peace, and Otis decided that Sidney was a good name for the town. The following year, Montana became a state and Sidney was incorporated in 1911.

Sidney was originally part of Dawson County, but became the county seat of Richland County at its inception in 1914.

Agriculture became an important part of the region after the Lower Yellowstone Irrigation Project was completed in 1909. A dam was built on the river south of Glendive, which diverted water from the river into a  main canal, which runs north–south, parallel to the Yellowstone, irrigating land from Glendive north up to Fairview, where it dumps into the Missouri River. This project irrigates  and serves water to 450 farms, according to the manager of the  Lower Yellowstone Irrigation Districts.

During the Great Depression, Montana artist J. K. Ralston painted a Federal Arts Project mural at the Richland County Courthouse in Sidney.

The town received a boost in 1924 when the Holly Sugar Company opened up a sugar refinery in Sidney to process locally grown sugar beets.

The area experienced an oil boom and bust in the late 1970s and early 1980s, bringing an influx of people to the town for a short period of time. Around the start of the 21st century, the town started experiencing another surge in oil exploration activity.

The town's museum, the MonDak Heritage Center, was founded in 1967. The museum houses artifacts and archives that detail the history of life in eastern Montana and western North Dakota since the first pioneers arrived in the late 19th century.

Economy
Sidney relies heavily on farming, ranching, and oil production for economic stability. The surrounding countryside is populated with many farms and cattle ranches, plus oil exploration activity. The area's main cash crop are sugar beets, and Sidney is home to a sugar beet factory, built in 1925. The factory is the largest employer in the city, next to the Sidney Health Center and Sidney Public Schools. The town is served by Sidney-Richland Municipal Airport, located one mile (1.6 km) west of the central business district, which has scheduled passenger commuter airline flights.

The city has two community newspapers, The Sidney Herald and The Roundup.

Education
Sidney has four public schools; one K, 1st, and 2nd grade (Westside Elementary) elementary school, a 3rd, 4th and 5th grade (Central Elementary) Elementary school, a 6-8 Junior High School, and a 9-12 senior high school.

There are no institutions of higher education located within the city, but Williston State College in North Dakota is within commuting distance. MSU-Billings offers courses through telecommunication, and Sidney High School has a variety of adult education classes each year.

Sidney has a public library, the Sidney-Richland County Library.

Geography

Sidney is located in the northeastern part of the state at  (47.712519, -104.161486), at an altitude of 1,949 feet (594 m).

Sidney experiences a semi-arid climate (Köppen BSk) with long, cold, dry winters and hot, more humid summers.

Demographics

2010 census
As of the census of 2010, there were 5,191 people, 2,304 households, and 1,378 families living in the city. The racial makeup of the city was 94.9% White, 0.1% African American, 1.8% Native American, 0.4% Asian, 0.7% from other races, and 2.2% from two or more races. Hispanic or Latino of any race were 3.4% of the population.

There were 2,304 households, of which 28.5% had children under the age of 18 living with them, 46.0% were married couples living together, 8.6% had a female householder with no husband present, 5.2% had a male householder with no wife present, and 40.2% were non-families. 33.7% of all households were made up of individuals, and 12.9% had someone living alone who was 65 years of age or older. The average household size was 2.24 and the average family size was 2.85.

The median age in the city was 39.3 years. 23.3% of residents were under the age of 18; 8.2% were between the ages of 18 and 24; 24.7% were from 25 to 44; 29% were from 45 to 64; and 14.8% were 65 years of age or older. The gender makeup of the city was 50.6% male and 49.4% female.

2000 census
As of the census of 2000, there were 4,774 people, 2,006 households, and 1,271 families living in the city. The population density was 2,125.3 people per square mile (819.2/km). There were 2,393 housing units at an average density of 1,065.3 per square mile (410.6/km). The racial makeup of the city was 95.81% White, 0.10% African American, 1.89% Native American, 0.31% Asian, 1.01% from other races, and 0.88% from two or more races. Hispanic or Latino of any race were 2.43% of the population.

There were 2,006 households, out of which 31.8% had children under the age of 18 living with them, 49.8% were married couples living together, 9.9% had a female householder with no husband present, and 36.6% were non-families. 33.0% of all households were made up of individuals, and 15.3% had someone living alone who was 65 years of age or older. The average household size was 2.33 and the average family size was 2.98.

In the city, the population was spread out, with 26.7% under the age of 18, 7.1% from 18 to 24, 26.6% from 25 to 44, 21.8% from 45 to 64, and 18.0% who were 65 years of age or older. The median age was 39 years. For every 100 females there were 92.3 males. For every 100 females age 18 and over, there were 85.8 males.

The median income for a household in the city was $32,109, and the median income for a family was $38,992. Males had a median income of $30,347 versus $18,517 for females. The per capita income for the city was $16,911. About 8.5% of families and 12.7% of the population were below the poverty line, including 17.1% of those under age 18 and 8.7% of those age 65 or over.

Radio
 KEYZ  AM 660
 KGCX  FM 93.1
 KTHC  FM 95.1
 KYYZ  FM 96.1
 KDSR  FM 101.1

Education
Sidney Public Schools educates students from kindergarten through 12th grade. Sidney High School's team name is the Eagles.

Notable people
 Florrie Fisher, former drug addict and motivational speaker, retired to Sidney.
 Clyde Lamb, gag cartoonist and syndicated comic strip artist, born in Sidney.
 Roger A. Markle, director of the U.S. Bureau of Mines and executive of Quaker State and NERCO, born in Sidney
 Donald Nutter, former Governor of Montana (1961–62), grew up in Sidney.
 Barry Petersen, Emmy Award-winning CBS News correspondent, graduated from Sidney High School in 1966.
 Chuck Stevenson, race car driver, born in Sidney.

References

External links

Sidney Area Chamber of Commerce - official site
Sidney Saddle Club

Cities in Richland County, Montana
County seats in Montana
1911 establishments in Montana
Populated places established in 1911
Cities in Montana